The 11th Legislative Assembly of Quebec was the provincial legislature in Quebec, Canada that existed from November 25, 1904 to June 8, 1908. The Quebec Liberal Party led by Simon-Napoléon Parent and Lomer Gouin was the governing party. Gouin replaced Parent in early 1905.

Seats per political party

 After the 1904 elections

Member list

This was the list of members of the Legislative Assembly of Quebec that were elected in the 1904 election:

Other elected MLAs

Other MLAs were elected during this mandate in by-elections

 Guillaume-Édouard Ouellet, Quebec Liberal Party, Yamaska, June 20, 1905 
 George Washington Stephens Jr., Quebec Liberal Party, Montreal division no. 4, October 7, 1905 
 Cyprien Dorris, Quebec Liberal Party, Napierville, December 14, 1905 
 Charles-Eugène Côté, Quebec Liberal Party, St. Sauveur, October 14, 1905 
 William Frederick Vilas, Quebec Liberal Party, Brome, September 10, 1906 
 Louis-Joseph Gauthier, Quebec Liberal Party, L'Assomption, October 29, 1906 
 Joseph-Aldéric Benoit, Quebec Liberal Party, Iberville, November 5, 1906 
 Louis-Albin Thériault, Quebec Liberal Party, Iles de la Madeleine, November 20, 1906 
 Charles Ernest Gault, Quebec Conservative Party, Montréal division no.5,  January 24, 1907 
 Charles Ramsey Devlin, Quebec Liberal Party, Nicolet, November 4, 1907 
 Pierre-Émile D'Anjou, Quebec Liberal Party, Rimouski, November 4, 1907 
 Honoré Mercier Jr., Quebec Liberal Party, Châteauguay, December 16, 1907

Cabinet Ministers

Parent Cabinet (1904-1905)

 Prime Minister and Executive Council President: Simon-Napoleon Parent
 Agriculture: Adélard Turgeon (1904-1905), Némèse Garneau (1905)
 Colonization and Public Works: Lomer Gouin 
 Lands, Mines and Fishing: Simon-Napoleon Parent
 Attorney General:Horace Archambault
 Provincial secretary: Amédée Robitaille 
 Treasurer: John Charles McCorkill
 Members without portfolios, George Washington Stephens, James John Guerin, William Alexander Weir, Dominique Monet (1905)

Gouin Cabinet (1905-1908)

 Prime Minister and Executive Council President: Lomer Gouin
 Agriculture: Auguste Tessier (1905-1906), Jules Allard (1906-1908)
 Colonization and Public Works: Jules Allard (1905)
 Lands, Mines and Fishing: Adélard Turgeon (1905)
 Colonisation, Mines and Fishing: Jean Prevost (1905-1907), Lomer Gouin (1907), Charles Devlin Ramsey (1907-1908)
 Public Works and Labor: Jules Allard (1905-1906), William Alexandre Weir (1906-1907), Louis-Alexandre Taschereau (1907-1908)
 Lands and Forests: Adélard Turgeon (1905-1908)
 Attorney General:Lomer Gouin
 Provincial secretary: Louis-Rodolphe Roy
 Treasurer: John Charles McCorkill (1905-1906), Auguste Tessier (1906-1907), William Alexander Weir (1907-1908)
 Members without portfolios: William Alexander Weir (1905-1906), John Charles Kaine (1906-1908)

References
 1904 election results
 List of Historical Cabinet Ministers

11